The Fool is a 1990 British film, produced and directed by Christine Edzard from a script by Edzard and Olivier Stockman.

Plot 
The narrative is grounded in the double life of a humble clerk who poses as the reclusive, but widely respected "Sir John." He thus moves in wealthy upper class circles and participates in grand investment schemes while living in a London slum.

The opening credits end with: “This film is dedicated to the anonymous men and women interviewed by Henry Mayhew in London between 1848 and 1861.”

Cast 
Derek Jacobi as Mr. Frederick / Sir John
Cyril Cusack as The Ballad Seller
Ruth Mitchell as The Girl
Maria Aitken as Lady Amelia
Irina Brook as Georgiana Shillibeer
Paul Brooke as Lord Paramount
Richard Caldicot as Duke
James Cairncross as Mr. Trott
Jim Carter as Mr. Blackthorn
Jonathan Cecil as Sir Martin Locket
Maria Charles as The Pure Gatherer
Richard Clifford as George Locket
James Cosmo as Mr. Bowring
Rosalie Crutchley as Mrs. Harris
Chris Darwin as Theatre Doorman
Colleen Neary McClure as Beauty
Michael Hordern as Mr. Tatham
Stratford Johns as Arthur Shillibeer

Production 
Jacobi and Cusack had previously worked with Edzard on her film adaptation of Charles Dickens Little Dorrit in 1987.

The atmospheric camerawork was by British cinematographer Robin Vidgeon.

Notes

References 
Halliwell's Film Guide 2008, HarperCollins (2007)

External links 

1990 films
British drama films
1990 drama films
1990s English-language films
1990s British films